Yasser Ayyash (born December 4, 1955, in Shatana in Irbid, Jordan) is a former archbishop of the Melkite Greek Catholic Archeparchy of Petra and Philadelphia in Amman and the current Melkite Greek Catholic Patriarchal Archeparchy of Jerusalem.

Priest

The young Yasser Ayyash attended the school of Greek Catholics in his Shatana hometown. Later he continued his education in Beit Sahour and Bethlehem, where he obtained his baccalaureate degree. Ayyash studied theology and biblical studies in Lebanon, he finished studying in Rome with the completion of a bachelor's degree in philosophy and theology at the Pontifical University of Saint Thomas Aquinas in Rome. In 1983 he was ordained a deacon in Rome, and to the priesthood on July 12, 1987 in Amman. It was followed by an extended use in parishes and schools in the capital Amman and Jerash.

Archeparch

The Melkite Synod in 2007 elected on 21 June 2007 Yasser Ayyash as Archbishop of Petra and Philadelphia, becoming himself the first native Jordanian in this archeparchy and successor of the Lebanese Georges El-Murr. The episcopal ordination was on October 13, 2007, and was performed by Melkite Patriarch of Antioch Gregory III Laham, BS, and the co-consecrators were Archbishop Georges El-Murr, BC of Petra and Philadelphia and Bishop Joseph Absi, SMSP, auxiliary bishop in the Patriarchate of Antioch. In October 2010, Ayyash participated in the Special Assembly of the Synod of Bishops in Rome as delegated Bishop of the Melkites of Jordan. About the situation of the Church in the Middle East, he emphasized the relatively good position of the Eastern Churches in Jordan and explained that in Jordan churches, schools and other facilities could be built. Ayyash regretted the emigration of many Christians and called for a deepening of interreligious dialogue in the Middle East.

Ayyash renounced to his office as Melkite Archeparchy of Petra and Philadelphia on April 14, 2015.

On February 9, 2018, Ayyash was elected Patriarchal Vicar of Jerusalem by the Melkite Synod.  He succeeded Archbishop Joseph Jules Zerey.

References

External links
 http://www.catholic-hierarchy.org/bishop/bayyash.html
 https://web.archive.org/web/20070812131739/http://www.jordantimes.com/?news=2842
 http://www.mliles.com/melkite/indexmelkiteotherjordan.shtml
 http://www.apostolische-nachfolge.de/asien1.htm

1955 births
Jordanian Melkite Greek Catholics
Melkite Greek Catholic bishops
Living people
Pontifical University of Saint Thomas Aquinas alumni
People from Irbid Governorate